Bill Nagy (born October 26, 1987) is a former American football center and guard who played in the National Football League (NFL) for the Dallas Cowboys. He played college football for the University of Wisconsin. He was also a member of the Detroit Lions of the NFL.

Early years
Nagy attended Hudson High School, where he was a three-time all-conference and a two-time all-state selection at guard in football. He also earned two letters  in baseball and one in basketball.

He started only three games at right guard during his first three years at the University of Wisconsin. In 2009, he only played in three games after suffering an off the field injury in a moped accident. As a senior, he started eight of Wisconsin's thirteen games at three different positions (guard, center and tight end).

Professional career

Dallas Cowboys
Nagy was selected in the seventh round (252nd overall) of the 2011 NFL Draft by the Dallas Cowboys. After starting four games at left guard in his rookie season, he suffered a fractured ankle while playing against the New England Patriots and was placed on the injured reserve list on October 18.

During the first week of training camp in 2012, he suffered a severe sprain on the same ankle he had fractured the previous season. On August 14, he was waived/injured with the intention of placing him on the injured reserve list.

Detroit Lions
On August 16, 2012, the Detroit Lions claimed him off waivers, knowing he would have to spend the remainder of the season on the injured reserve list. On July 24, 2013, he was released after not being able to recover from his ankle injury.

Personal life
Nagy served as a strength and conditioning graduate assistant at the University of Pittsburgh. In 2015, he joined the University of Wisconsin football coaching staff.

References

1987 births
Living people
American football centers
American football offensive guards
Dallas Cowboys players
Detroit Lions players
People from Hudson, Ohio
Players of American football from Ohio
Players of American football from Utah
Sportspeople from Orem, Utah
Wisconsin Badgers football coaches
Wisconsin Badgers football players